The Murat Paşa Mosque is a 15th century Ottoman mosque squeezed in between two busy roads linking Aksaray and Yusufpaşa in the Fatih district of Istanbul, Turkey.

Architecture
The mosque was commissioned in 1465-66 by Hass Murad Pasha (mod. Turkish Has Murat Paşa)  and completed after his death by his brother Mesih Pasha, who was buried here. 

The mosque is designed in the early Ottoman style perfected in Bursa. The mihrab and minbar are on the short side of the rectangle. The main space is approached via a narthex rather like those in Byzantine churches. This is preceded by a portico.

See also
 List of mosques
 Ottoman architecture

References

Sources
 
 

15th-century mosques
Ottoman mosques in Istanbul
Mosque buildings with domes